Alina Aleksandrovna Soupian (born May 28, 2004) is an Israeli figure skater. On the junior level, she is the 2018 Golden Spin of Zagreb champion, the 2019 Open Ice Mall Cup champion, and the 2019 Israeli junior national champion.

She qualified for the free skate at the 2019 World Junior Figure Skating Championships.

Competitive highlights 
GP: Grand Prix; CS: Challenger Series; JGP: Junior Grand Prix

References 

Living people
2004 births
Israeli female single skaters